Bajola  is a village in Kapurthala district of Punjab State, India. The village is administrated by a Sarpanch, who is an elected representative.

Demography 
According to the report published by Census India in 2011, Bajola has a total number of 87 houses and population of 552; of which include 287 males and 265 females. The literacy rate of Bajola is 77.89%, higher than the state average of 75.84%. The population of children under the age of 6 years is 68, which is 12.32% of total population of Bajola, and the child sex ratio is approximately 838 lower than state average of 846.

Population data

Air travel connectivity 
The closest airport to the village is Sri Guru Ram Dass Jee International Airport.

Villages in Kapurthala

External links
  Villages in Kapurthala
 Kapurthala Villages List

References

Villages in Kapurthala district